Kherson National Technical University is a technical institution in Kherson, Ukraine.

History
The university was founded in 1959 by a group of visiting students who worked on Kherson Cotton, in organized training and consulting point (NCP) of the Kiev Technological Institute of Light Industry. The Faculty of General Studies (BTF) was established in 1960 based on the NCP.

Under orders from the Ministry of Education of the USSR, Kherson BTF was transferred to Odessa Technological Institute of Food Industry University, MV University (OTIHP) in 1961.

In 1962 BTF was turned into a branch of Odessa Technological Institute with two faculties: mechanics and general technical and technological. Beginning then, Kherson branch began to grow extremely rapidly.

In December 1980 on the basis of branch OTIHP opened Kherson Industrial Institute. While the Industrial Institute was the only universities in Ukraine, which trained engineers for the primary processing of flax, weaving, spinning.

In 1997 Kherson industrial institute created Postsecondary Education (Cabinet of Ministers of Ukraine dated March 24, 1997 No. 254).

Decree of the President of Ukraine from November 15, 2004 No. 1403/2004 Postsecondary Education granted national status.

Campuses and buildings
The material and technology base consists of settles KNTU of 7 study buildings, science and technology library, computer center, three dormitories, dining room, buffet, sports complexes, recreation on the Dnieper, student polyclinic.

Institutes and faculties

 Faculty of Economics
 Faculty of Cybernetics
 Faculty of Technology and Design
 Faculty of Engineering
 Department of International Economic Relations
 Faculty of correspondence and distance learning

Remote subdivisions HNTU:

 Theodosia faculty HNTU
 Perekopsky faculty HNTU
 Kerch Department HNTU
 Genichesk faculty HNTU
 Tavricheskiy Regional Faculty
 Yalta training and consulting center

External links
Official site

1959 establishments in Ukraine
National universities in Ukraine